The Last Time I Lied is a 2018 thriller novel by American author Todd Ritter under the penname Riley Sager.

Synopsis
Fifteen years ago three campers at a prestigious camp for the wealthy, Camp Nightingale, snuck out of their cabin after lights out, never to be seen again. Their fellow camper, Emma, was the last to see them alive. A young man, Theo, was blamed for their disappearances but never received punishment. This reality has stuck with Emma throughout her life and now as an artist, she includes pieces of that past in all of her artwork. This detail catches the eye of the current owner of Camp Nightingale, Francesca, who hires her to work as an art counselor. 

Once back at the camp Emma begins to remember more of that fateful summer and also discovers hints that the camp is not all it seems to be, as the lake next to the camp holds the ruins of an asylum. This earns her Francesca's mistrust, increasing the sense of unease and danger that Emma feels. Compounding her confusion, footage surfaces that shows Emma leaving the cabin immediately after the other three girls, implying that she was responsible for their deaths.

Ultimately it is revealed that Chet, Francesca's adopted son, doctored footage to make it seem as if Emma was responsible. He is also Theo's brother and was resentful that Emma accused Theo of the disappearances. He manages to overcome her and takes her to the underwater asylum with the intention of leaving her there. While down there they discover the bodies of the missing girls. Emma is rescued by Theo. The following police investigation initially believes that the three girls dove down to find the asylum but drowned in the process. This is proven false, as only two of the bodies are present and the remains clearly show that they were murdered.

Months later the third missing girl, Vivian, appears at one of Emma's art shows and reveals that she murdered them. The girls were present when Vivian's sister drowned but made no move to save her, so she killed them as an act of revenge.

Development
After writing Final Girls Sager struggled to find an idea that would work as a good follow up novel. He came up with the idea for The Last Time I Lied after viewing the film Picnic at Hanging Rock and thinking "Yes, this is it: girls vanish into the woods, never to be seen again, and it messes everyone up. That’s my next book.” He had initially intended to not include flashbacks, as he used this as a plot device in the last book, but that "the past just kept coming back in these chapters, and it came to the point where I just needed to do flashbacks, there’s just no way around it."

Release
The Last Time I Lied was first published in hardback and ebook format in the United States on July 3, 2018, through Dutton. An audiobook adaptation narrated by Nicol Zanzarella was released simultaneously through Penguin Audio. 

The book has been published in the United Kingdom and has been translated into Chinese and German.

Reception
Upon release The Last Time I Lied received reviews from outlets such as Booklist and placed on the New York Times Bestseller List for the week of July 22, 2018. In The New York Times Alafair Burke wrote that "in the end, the author delivers the kind of unpredictable conclusion that all thriller readers crave — utterly shocking yet craftily foreshadowed. For some readers, though, these might be the only pages that linger." The Wall Street Journal also reviewed the book.

References

2018 American novels
American thriller novels
Novels by Riley Sager
E. P. Dutton books